The 2017 San Jose Earthquakes season is the club's 35th year of existence, their 20th season in Major League Soccer and their 10th consecutive season in the top-flight of American soccer.

Current squad

Current roster 
As of October 23, 2017.

Non-competitive

California

Arizona

Nevada

California

Competitive

Major League Soccer

Standings 

Western Conference Table

Overall table

Results

MLS Cup Playoffs

U.S. Open Cup

Player statistics

Top scorers

As of 22 October 2017.

Player movement

In 
Per Major League Soccer and club policies terms of the deals do not get disclosed.

Out

Loans 
Per Major League Soccer and club policies terms of the deals do not get disclosed.

In

Draft picks 
Draft picks are not automatically signed to the team roster. Only those who are signed to a contract will be listed as transfers in.

References

San Jose Earthquakes
San Jose Earthquakes seasons
San Jose Earthquakes
San Jose Earthquakes